A Lamington is a type of sponge or butter cake.

Lamington may also refer to:

Places

In Australia:
Lamington, Queensland, a locality in the Scenic Rim Region
Lamington National Park, in Queensland
Lamington Bridge, in Queensland
Lamington, Western Australia and West Lamington, Western Australia, two settlements in Kalgoorlie, Western Australia

In New Jersey:
Lamington, New Jersey, an unincorporated area within Bedminster Township
Lamington River, a tributary of the North Branch Raritan River

In Scotland:
Lamington, Aberdeenshire
Lamington, Highland
Lamington, South Lanarkshire
Lamington Hill, South Lanarkshire

Elsewhere:
Lamington Road, an electronic goods market in Mumbai, India
Mount Lamington, a volcano in the Oro Province of Papua New Guinea

Other
Baron Lamington, a British peerage title